Karstedt, von Karstedt is a German surname, its English language version may be Karshtedt, from .

Susanne Karstedt
Bruce D. Karstedt, creator of Karstedt's catalyst
Elizabeth von Karstedt, first wife of Walther von Brauchitsch

German-language surnames